BTB may refer to:

In biology:
 Blood–testis barrier in testicular anatomy
 Blood–thymus barrier
 Bovine tuberculosis or Mycobacterium bovis, a disease originating in cattle
 Breakthrough bleeding, of the menstrual period
 Bromothymol blue, a chemical indicator for weak acids and bases
 BTB/POZ domain, a protein domain

In other uses:
Belgian Union of Transport Workers, a trade union in Belgium
Branch target buffer, a computer processor element
Bétou Airport, in the Republic of the Congo (IATA airport code: BTB)
Basil Temple Blackwood (1870–1917), British book illustrator (credited as B.T.B.)
Bob the Builder, British children's television series